The Tromaville Café is a television program broadcast by the BBC in the United Kingdom from 1997 to 2000 that ran Troma films.

The show featured Lloyd Kaufman as himself, different actors portraying Toxie, Paul Kyrmse as Sgt. Kabukiman N.Y.P.D., Stephen Blackehart as Felix the French Trickster and scantily clad Tromettes (Debbie Rochon, Stephanie Stokes, Tiffany Shepis, etc.) playing waitress/action news reporters. Another regular on the show was Joe Fleishaker, who portrayed Troma VP and co-founder Michael Herz.

References

External links
http://m.imdb.com/title/tt0283647

BBC Television shows
Troma Entertainment films
Works by James Gunn